Eugène Petit (1839–1886) was a French flower painter and textile designer.

Biography
Eugene Petit was born in Paris in 1839. He briefly taught the American painter Henry Woodbridge Parton, 1875.

He specialized in still life paintings of flowers and fruits, as well as sporting dogs. His work has been found in museums in Carcassonne, Compiègne, Courtrai, Rouen and Saint-Etienne in France as well as The Sladmore Gallery in London. Some of his work has been auctioned at Bonhams. One of his hunting scenes, "On the Scent, Setters" sold at Sothebys in New York for $13,200 in 2006.

Work
 Summer Flowers in a Vase
 Still life with peonies and roses
 Daisies, Poppies And Wild Roses
 Summer blooms in a glass vase
 Spaniels hunting duck
 Still life
 Setters flushing out ducks
 Chrysanthemums in a brass urn, and a silver tray and jug on a draped table
 The Chase
 Setters flushing out duck
 Blossom branches and peonies in a vase
 On the point
 On the point 2
 Pointers on the scent
 Pointers by the edge of a lake
 A pointer and a setter on the scent
 The Garden Gate
 Two Pointers Hunting by a Path
 Le chemin aux arbres et fleurs

References

External links
 WikiGallery

1839 births
1886 deaths
Painters from Paris
19th-century French painters
French male painters
Flower artists
19th-century French male artists